Ampelocalamus scandens is a species of bamboo native to the Guizhou province of China. It can reach heights of 10 m and a stem diameter of 0.8 cm and grows at an altitude of between 265 – 320m.

References

Bambusoideae